Exeter Friendly Society (which since 2015 has traded as The Exeter) is a British friendly society offering a range of insurance products including Income Protection Insurance, Private Medical Insurance, Cashplans and Life Insurance.

They are one of the United Kingdom's largest friendly societies with over 90,000 members and more than 100 employees.

History 
The Exeter was established in 1927 and is to this day based in the city of Exeter, Devon.

It originally traded under the name Exeter Family Friendly Society. In 2008, Exeter Family Friendly Society and Pioneer friendly society completed a merger, with Exeter Family Friendly becoming the trading name of the new merged organization.

In 2015 a re-branding was completed, with the society now known simply as The Exeter.

Later in 2015, The Exeter acquired a portfolio of individual and corporate cash plan schemes from Engage Mutual Health, extending their range of products which had previously been limited to Private Medical Insurance and Income Protection.

In 2017 the range of products was extended further when The Exeter entered the Term Life Assurance market. They first launched ‘Managed Life’, a product aimed at people with type 2 diabetes or a high body mass index (BMI). This product allows members to ‘manage’ their condition, with the potential for premiums to reduce over time if their condition improves (and increase if it does not).

Later in 2017, The Exeter launched an extension of their Life Insurance product – ‘Impaired Lives’. This product offered life insurance for those that would otherwise find it difficult to obtain cover. The launch came swiftly after the withdrawal of Just Retirement from the Impaired Life insurance market.

Offices 

The Exeter have a single office, their head office based in Exeter Business Park.

Sponsorships 

Recently, The Exeter has promoted itself through sponsorship of local sports. They are one of the key sponsors of Premiership rugby team, Exeter Chiefs, with their logo featuring prominently on the 2018/19 Away and Cup kits.

References

External links
 Association of Friendly Societies
 Exeter Friendly homepage

Companies based in Exeter
Friendly societies of the United Kingdom
Organizations established in 1927